Arthur Day (29 July 1878 – 10 December 1944) was an English professional golfer. Day won the inaugural Welsh Professional Championship in 1904. Later he was the professional at Ganton Golf Club for over 30 years during which time he won the 1921 Leeds Cup.

Early life
Day was born in Burnham-on-Sea, Somerset, the son of Joseph and Elizabeth Day. He learnt his golf at the nearby Burnham & Berrow Golf Club.

Golf career
Representing Burnham, Day played in a professional tournament at Royal North Devon Golf Club in August 1899. He played in the initial 36-hole stroke-play stage but was not in the leading 16 who qualified for the match-play stage. Soon afterwards he moved to Tenby and played from there in the 1900 Open Championship. He remained at Tenby until 1905, when he moved to Scarborough Town Golf Club to replace Willie Gaudin. During his time at Tenby he won the first Welsh Professional Championship which was held at Radyr Golf Club on 15 July 1904. It was a 36-hole stroke-play event played on a single day. Day was among the 19 entries and had rounds of 81 and 80 for a total of 161. This put him three strokes ahead of the joint runners-up, 20-year-old George Duncan and Bill Leaver, who had finished 8th in the 1903 Open Championship. For his win he received 10 guineas and a gold medal.

Day was at Scarborough Town until 1913 when he left to become the Ganton Golf Club professional in succession to P.J. Adams. While at Ganton he won the 1921 Leeds Cup which was played at Ganton. His 36-hole score of 147 was 4 strokes ahead of the field and he took the first prize of £10.

Death
Day was still the Ganton professional when he died at his home there on 10 December 1944. He had two sons, Phil and Hugh, who were both professional golfers. He was replaced at Ganton by Jock Ballantine who was appointed in early 1946.

Professional wins
1904 Welsh Professional Championship
1921 Leeds Cup

Results in major championships

Note: Day only played in The Open Championship.

NT = No tournament
WD = withdrew
CUT = missed the half-way cut
? = finish unknown
"T" indicates a tie for a place

References

English male golfers
People from Burnham-on-Sea
People from Ganton
Sportspeople from Scarborough, North Yorkshire
1878 births
1946 deaths